Damien Lewis may refer to:

 Damien Lewis (American football) (born 1997), American football player
 Damien Lewis (filmmaker) (born 1966), British author and filmmaker

See also
 Damian Lewis (born 1971), English actor
 Damion Lewis (born 1995), American association football goalkeeper